Gabriela Mosqueira Benítez (born 5 April 1990, Asunción) is a Paraguayan rower. She competed in the single sculls race at the 2012 Summer Olympics and placed 2nd in Final D and 20th overall.  She competed in the same event at the 2016 Summer Olympics, finishing in 1st in the D Final, 19th overall.

References

1990 births
Living people
Paraguayan female rowers
Olympic rowers of Paraguay
Rowers at the 2012 Summer Olympics
Rowers at the 2016 Summer Olympics
Rowers at the 2011 Pan American Games
Rowers at the 2015 Pan American Games
South American Games silver medalists for Paraguay
South American Games medalists in rowing
Competitors at the 2010 South American Games

People from Asunción
Rowers at the 2019 Pan American Games
Pan American Games competitors for Paraguay
21st-century Paraguayan women
20th-century Paraguayan women